The oceanic lightfish (Vinciguerria nimbaria) a lightfish of the genus Vinciguerria, is found in all deep tropical and subtropical oceans and seas, from depths of 20 to 5,000 m.  Its length is between 2 and 5 cm.
It is the main prey of tuna during the tuna fishing season (late autumn and winter) in the equatorial Atlantic. Its own diet is varied and is dependent on its location. In equatorial locations it has been found to behave as a mesopelagic fish and as an opportunistic mesozooplankton feeder, whilst further north in oligotrophic typical tropical structures it was found to behave as an epipelagic fish, feeding on the dominant small prey during the daytime.

References

 
 Tony Ayling & Geoffrey Cox, Collins Guide to the Sea Fishes of New Zealand,  (William Collins Publishers Ltd, Auckland, New Zealand 1982) 

Phosichthyidae
Vinciguerria
Fish described in 1895
Taxa named by David Starr Jordan